Kakanj Mine disaster may refer to:
1934 Kakanj mine disaster that killed 127 miners,
1965 Kakanj mine disaster that killed 128 miners.